Messier 71 (also known as M71 or NGC 6838) is a globular cluster in the small northern constellation Sagitta. It was discovered by Philippe Loys de Chéseaux in 1745 and included by Charles Messier in his catalog of non-comet-like objects in 1780. It was also noted by Koehler at Dresden around 1775.

This star cluster is about 13,000 light years away from Earth and spans . The irregular variable star Z Sagittae is a member.

M71 was for many decades thought (until the 1970s) to be a densely packed open cluster and was classified as such by leading astronomers in the field of star cluster research due to its lacking a dense central compression, and to its stars having more "metals" than is usual for an ancient globular cluster; furthermore, it lacks the RR Lyrae "cluster" variable stars that are common in most globulars. However, modern photometric photometry has detected a short "horizontal branch" in the H-R diagram (chart of temperature versus luminosity) which is characteristic of a globular cluster. The shortness of the branch explains the lack of RR Lyrae variables and is due to the globular's relatively young age of 9–10 billion years. Taking in many or only late series (Population I) stars explains relatively its stars. Hence today M71 is designated as a very loosely concentrated globular cluster, much like M68 in Hydra.

See also
 List of Messier objects

References

See also
 NGC 6366
 NGC 6342

External links
 
 Messier71 @ SEDS Messier pages
 Messier 71, Galactic Globular Clusters Database page
 Messier 71, LRGB CCD image based on two hours total exposure
 Messier 71: an Unusual Globular Cluster, ESA\Hubble picture of the week.
 

Messier 071
Messier 071
071
Messier 071
?